Antonio Mucci was an Argentine politician, and Minister of Labor during the presidency of Raúl Alfonsín. He promoted a reduction of the influence of Peronism over the Argentine unions, and helped the President draft a bill for the Congress for that purpose. He resigned when the bill was rejected.

Bibliography
 

Ministers of labor of Argentina
Radical Civic Union politicians
1932 births
2004 deaths